Rosalie Plains is a rural locality in the Toowoomba Region, Queensland, Australia.

History 
The locality takes its name from an early pastoral run that was held by Robert Ramsay in the late 1840s.

In 1877,  were resumed from the Rosalie Plains pastoral run and offered for selection on 17 April 1877.

Ashlea Provisional School opened on January 1907. On 1 January 1909 it became Ashlea State School, being renamed Rosalie Plains State School in 1916. It closed circa 1944.

Road infrastructure
The Oakey–Cooyar Road runs through from south to north, and Pechey-Maclagan Road exits to the west.

References 

Toowoomba Region
Localities in Queensland